Rik De Voest and John Peers were the defending champions, but chose not to compete.
Jonathan Erlich and Andy Ram defeated Chris Guccione and Matt Reid 6–3, 6–7(6–8), [10–2].

Seeds

Draw

References 
 Main Draw

Comerica Bank Challenger - Doubles
Nordic Naturals Challenger